, or The Aquatope of White Sand, subtitled The Two Girls Met in the Ruins of Damaged Dream, is an anime television series produced by P.A. Works. It aired from July to December 2021.

Plot
Set in Nanjō, Okinawa, The Aquatope on White Sand tells the story of two girls; Kukuru Misakino, who is chasing her dream by working at an aquarium, and Fūka Miyazawa, an idol from Tokyo who has given up her position and journeyed to Okinawa in search of something new.

Characters

Main 

A high school student who works at Gama Gama Aquarium as its Deputy Director. She is determined to save the aquarium with creativity and hard work. Her love for sea creatures knows no bounds and is known for being a sea creature geek. She lives with her grandparents as her parents died when she was young. After the closure of Gama Gama Aquarium, she graduates high school and landed a job at Tingarla Aquarium under a recommendation by her grandfather, only to be placed in the PR and marketing department by its director. While working at Tingarla Aquarium she is given the nickname "Plankton" by the vice director.

A former idol who has given up on her dream for the sake of another member and escaped to Okinawa. Her former fame troubled her, as was her decision of sacrificing her idol career, but Gama Gama Aquarium quickly became her safe haven and her new-found passion. After the closure of Gama Gama Aquarium, she went back to her hometown in Iwate. Although she was offered a movie role to revive her entertainment career, she returns instead to Okinawa to work at Tingarla Aquarium as a caretaker in the Aquatic Animals Department.

Kukuru's childhood friend. She helps her mother with running her local diner "Kamee." She is nicknamed "Udon-chan" because her name happens to be a type of an udon, Tsukimi Udon. After graduation, she works part-time at a diner called Ohana as training, while her mother takes over Kamee.

An office lady who is working on helping the city increase its tourists. She is close to Kukuru, and quickly warmed up to Fūka after their first encounter. After the closure of Gama Gama, she decided to quit her job and landed a job at Tingarla Aquarium, being in the same department as Kukuru.

Kukuru's childhood friend. He often helps his father who is a fisherman and decided to work part-time at Gama Gama Aquarium help Kukuru in her efforts to prevent it from closing down. After graduation, he landed a job at Tingarla Aquarium together with Kukuru in the Aquatic Animals Department. It is strongly implied that he has feelings for Kukuru. He also has a younger sister named Maho.

A worker at Gama Gama Aquarium. Cold and aloof, though often complaining about the tremendous workload given by Kukuru, is strongly passionate about his work, though he does not show it at all times. Due to past circumstances, he is also known to be bad at dealing with women - and are often more energetic upon consuming alcohol or being around the guys. After the closure of Gama Gama Aquarium, he gets transferred to Tingarla Aquarium under the recommendation of Gama Gama Aquarium's director.

Tingarla Aquarium Staff 

A staff from Tingarla Aquarium, an aquarium that is scheduled to open in the city center following the closure of Gama Gama Aquarium. She was assigned to train at Gama Gama Aquarium. Having continuously put up with Kukuru's biased behavior, she concludes that the training at Gama Gama Aquarium is ineffective for her, someone who undertook countless hours of training to achieve her dream job. She eventually decides to move to another aquarium to continue her training due to this. It is revealed later on that her desperation towards her job stems from her past experiences where she has lost her job at another aquarium due to her unable to manage her full time job while raising her child as a single mother

A fish caretaker at Tingarla Aquarium who used to study together with Chiyu. She is often mistaken for being a man for her tomboyish appearance and behavior. She is also passionate about environmental issues and ends up being selected for the special training course in Hawaii. 

She is a university student who works part-time at the Tingarla Aquarium office and has a friendly personality. 

A friendly girl and penguin breeder. She's a Venezuelan descent who at first has difficulty with speaking in Japanese, so she chose to work at aquarium because she doesn't need to talk to communicate with the sea creatures.

He got a job at the Tingarla Aquarium as a fish breeder after finishing graduate school. He is also a sea creature geek and often relates the people around him with sea creatures, seeing things in context of marine life.

The director of Tingarla Aquarium from Hawaii and an acquaintance of Kukuru's grandfather, who has a cheerful personality towards the staff and customers.

A tough, no-nonsense vice director who works in the sales department and does not show much emotion. He is formerly a banker.

The breeding manager who is calm and friendly in stark contrast to the vice president's serious attitude during office hours.

Others 

The director of Gama Gama Aquarium and Kukuru's grandfather. When he took over Gama Gama Aquarium, he never knew what to do with the place. While intending to let go of the aquarium, he also considered letting Kukuru taking her chances at reviving the place.

Production and release 
The Aquatope on White Sand was announced on January 15, 2021. The series was directed by Toshiya Shinohara and written by Yūko Kakihara. It features character designs by U35 and Yuki Akiyama, and music by Yoshiaki Dewa. It aired from July 9 to December 17, 2021, on Tokyo MX and other channels. The first opening theme, was performed by Arcana Project, while the first ending theme, was performed by Mia Regina. Arcana Project also performed the second opening theme , while Risa Aizawa from Dempagumi.inc performed the second ending theme . Crunchyroll licensed the series outside of Asia. Muse Communication licensed the series in South and Southeast Asia. The series ran for 24 episodes.

Episode list

Reception
Reviews of the series have been positive. David Lynn of Collider, described the series as ringing true, in the case of Fūka, to "the feeling of being lost and trying to find something" to attach yourself to, and praised Kukuru as acting as Fūka's foil, saying she represents "the feeling of pursuing a vague future you want but can't completely define." He concluded that the show captures the "feeling of being between stages of life, lost but searching." Mercedez Clewis, reviewing the show's first two episodes, wrote on Anime News Network that she enjoyed the episodes, believing that the show can deliver on its combination of various elements, and saying she has "high hopes for this series", and thought that the show has "the potential to be one of the most beautiful new series this season." She also argued that she considered the series to be "yuri-coded". In reviews of episodes 3–5, Clewis praised the magical realism of the series, how it "captures living in a rural part of Japan," is optimistic, the well-done story, and reads the cast as having "bits of queerness."

Christy Gibbs of CBR argued that the series "leans hard on themes such as environmentalism and sustainability," with the aquarium playing a big part in this narrative. Gibbs also said that the series uses "friendly environmentalism, small-town nostalgia, and ...[a] close-knit community" to its advantage, with viewers seeing the aquarium as the center of the series and a "magical place that brings people together and grants supernatural visions."

Franchise

Local promotion
The Nanjo Sightseeing Information Center in Nanjō, Okinawa, Japan and souvenir shop across the street have cardboard cut-outs of the show's characters, with the shop including an "entire Aquatope corner."

Notes

References

External links
Official website 

2021 anime television series debuts
Anime with original screenplays
Aquariums in fiction
Crunchyroll anime
Muse Communication
P.A.Works
Television shows set in Okinawa Prefecture
Tokyo MX original programming